The Medal of the Order "For Merit to the Fatherland" was established on 2 March 1994 by Presidential Decree No.442. Its award criteria were modified on 6 January 1999 by Presidential Decree 19 and again on 7 September 2010 by Presidential Decree 1099.  The medal of the Order is divided into two classes, the first and the second, it is further divided into a civilian and a military division, the medal of the military division is awarded "with swords" and its criteria differ from those of the civilian division.

Statute of the medal 

 Civilian Division first and second class. Awarded to citizens of the Russian Federation for outstanding achievements in various fields of industry, construction, science, education, health, culture, transport and other areas of work.
 Military Division first and second class. Awarded to members of the Armed Forces of the Russian Federation for great contribution to the defence of the Motherland, for success in maintaining the high combat readiness of the central organs of military administration, of military units and organizations, for strengthening the rule of law and order, for ensuring public safety.

Award description

The Medal of the Order "For Merit to the Fatherland" is 32mm in diameter and made of silver, the medal first class is gold plated.  The obverse bears a likeness of the Order, a crowned double headed eagle over a red-enamel . On the reverse, the motto of the Order: "BENEFIT, HONOUR AND GLORY". At the bottom, laurel leaves, the year of establishment "1994" and the award serial number. In the case of the military division, the sword device is added between the medal suspension ring and the pentagonal mount. The medal hangs from a standard Russian pentagonal mount covered by an overlapping scarlet ribbon.

Notable recipients
Sergey Tetyukhin
Aleksey Aleksandrov
Nikolay Baskov
Alexander Alexeyevich Chekalin
Vladimir Dementyev
Andrey Filatov
Vladimir Grachev
Roman Miroshnichenko
Alexey Gordeyev
Ilona Korstin
Mikhail Pletnev
Svetlana Vanyo
Anatoli Boukreev
Vyacheslav Borisov
Alexandra Trusova
Vladimir Kostitsyn
Irik Zhdanov
Alfred Grishin
Magomed Tushayev

See also
 Awards and decorations of the Russian Federation

References

External links
 The Commission on State Awards to the President of the Russian Federation

 
Military awards and decorations of Russia
Civil awards and decorations of Russia
Awards established in 1994
1994 establishments in Russia